is a private university in Higashi-ku, Sapporo, Hokkaido, Japan. The predecessor of the school, a women's vocational school, was founded in 1947. It was chartered as a junior college in 1950. In 2000, it became coeducational, adopting the present name at the same time. This school has its roots in a hospital started by 7 nuns from Europe who built a hospital for the poor in Sapporo.

External links
 Official website 

Educational institutions established in 1947
Private universities and colleges in Japan
Universities and colleges in Sapporo
1947 establishments in Japan
Catholic universities and colleges in Japan